Jesper Engström (born 24 April 1992) is a Finnish professional footballer who plays for VPS, as a defender.

Career
On 13 November 2019 FC Inter Turku confirmed that Engström would join the club for the 2020 season, signing a deal until the end of the year with an option for one further year.

In November 2021, it was announced that he would return to VPS for the 2022 season.

References

External links

1992 births
Living people
Finnish footballers
Vasa IFK players
Vaasan Palloseura players
FC YPA players
FC Inter Turku players
Veikkausliiga players
Kakkonen players
Association football defenders